Richard John Carey (born March 13, 1963) is an American former competition swimmer, three-time Olympic champion, and former world record-holder in three events.  Carey specialized in the backstroke.  At the 1984 Summer Olympics in Los Angeles, he won three gold medals.  He broke nine world records, five individually, and also was a double world champion. He was named as the Swimmer of the Year in 1983 by Swimming World magazine.

Career
Carey was selected to make his international debut at the 1980 Summer Olympics in Moscow, but had to withdraw when the United States boycotted the Olympics at Jimmy Carter's insistence due to the Soviet Union's invasion of Afghanistan.  In 1981 Carey was the American champion in both the 100-meter and 200-meter backstroke, setting a national record in the latter, after moving to the University of Texas at Austin to train under coach Eddie Reese.  In 1982 he collected gold in the 200-meter backstroke and 4×100-meter medley relay, and silver in the 100-meter backstroke at the World Championships in Guayaguil, Ecuador.

In 1983, Carey set world records of 55.38 seconds in the 100-meter and 1:58.93 in the 200-meter backstroke, breaking marks set in 1976 by John Naber.  At the 1983 Pan American Games that year in Caracas, Venezuela, he lowered the 100-meter record to 55.19 seconds and he also won the 200-meter event.  He also broke the world record in the 4×100-meter medley relay, along with Steve Lundquist, Matt Gribble and Rowdy Gaines, all of whom were world record-holders in their respective strokes.  This earned him the Swimmer of the Year award.

At the 1984 Summer Olympics, he won both backstroke events and again was part of the winning medley relay team. Carey created a minor controversy after his victory in the 200-meter backstroke, when despite winning Olympic gold, he appeared noticeably unhappy about having failed to break his own world record time. He later apologized and responded much more positively to his 100-meter win, despite the fact that it too fell short of his own world record.  He continued to win events at a national level thereafter, retiring in 1986. He was inducted into the International Swimming Hall of Fame as an "Honor Swimmer" in 1993.

According to his Linked-In profile, Carey now works for UBS in New York City.

See also

 List of multiple Olympic gold medalists
 List of Olympic medalists in swimming (men)
 List of University of Texas at Austin alumni
 List of World Aquatics Championships medalists in swimming (men)
 World record progression 100 metres backstroke
 World record progression 200 metres backstroke
 World record progression 4 × 100 metres medley relay

References

External links
 
 

1963 births
Living people
American male backstroke swimmers
World record setters in swimming
Olympic gold medalists for the United States in swimming
People from Mount Kisco, New York
Swimmers at the 1983 Pan American Games
Swimmers at the 1984 Summer Olympics
Texas Longhorns men's swimmers
World Aquatics Championships medalists in swimming
Medalists at the 1984 Summer Olympics
Pan American Games gold medalists for the United States
Pan American Games medalists in swimming
Medalists at the 1983 Pan American Games
Swimmers from New York (state)
20th-century American people
21st-century American people